Claire Samson (born April 12, 1955) is a Canadian politician in Quebec, who was elected to the National Assembly of Quebec in the 2014 election. She was elected to represent the electoral district of Iberville as a member of the Coalition Avenir Québec. She was also the party's candidate in Iberville in the 2012 election.

Within weeks of being re-elected in the 2018 election, Samson publicly announced that she was considering quitting politics, both for health reasons and because she felt snubbed by premier François Legault in not having been offered a cabinet position despite having been entrusted with a highly visible role as a party spokesperson during the election campaign.

On June 15, 2021, Samson was removed from the CAQ caucus after giving a $100 donation to the Conservative Party of Quebec, led by Éric Duhaime. On June 18, 2021, she officially joined the Conservative Party of Quebec to become its first sitting MNA.

Electoral record

References

Coalition Avenir Québec MNAs
Living people
French Quebecers
Women MNAs in Quebec
People from Montérégie
1955 births
21st-century Canadian politicians
21st-century Canadian women politicians
Politicians affected by a party expulsion process